Décio Viotti de Azevedo (born 12 October 1939) is a Brazilian former volleyball player who competed in the 1964 Summer Olympics and in the 1968 Summer Olympics. He was born in Belo Horizonte, Minas Gerais, Brazil. He played on the teams which won a gold medal at the 1963 Pan American Games and a silver medal at the 1967 Pan American Games. He was born in Belo Horizonte, Minas Gerais, Brazil.

References

1939 births
Living people
Brazilian men's volleyball players
Olympic volleyball players of Brazil
Volleyball players at the 1964 Summer Olympics
Volleyball players at the 1968 Summer Olympics
Volleyball players at the 1963 Pan American Games
Volleyball players at the 1967 Pan American Games
Pan American Games gold medalists for Brazil
Pan American Games silver medalists for Brazil
Pan American Games medalists in volleyball
Medalists at the 1963 Pan American Games
Medalists at the 1967 Pan American Games
Sportspeople from Belo Horizonte